Valley Green is a census-designated place (CDP) in York County, Pennsylvania, United States. The population was 3,429 at the 2010 census.

Geography
Valley Green is located at  (40.157831, -76.795986) in Newberry Township.

Demographics
At the 2000 census there were 3,550 people, 1,310 households, and 996 families living in the CDP. The population density was 2,588.5 people per square mile (1,000.5/km). There were 1,355 housing units at an average density of 988.0/sq mi (381.9/km).  The racial makeup of the CDP was 96.17% White, 1.52% African American, 0.03% Native American, 0.87% Asian, 0.06% Pacific Islander, 0.42% from other races, and 0.93% from two or more races. Hispanic or Latino of any race were 2.08%.

Of the 1,310 households 43.9% had children under the age of 18 living with them, 61.9% were married couples living together, 11.0% had a female householder with no husband present, and 23.9% were non-families. 18.0% of households were one person and 2.4% were one person aged 65 or older. The average household size was 2.71 and the average family size was 3.11.

The age distribution was 29.9% under the age of 18, 6.7% from 18 to 24, 38.6% from 25 to 44, 21.6% from 45 to 64, and 3.2% 65 or older. The median age was 33 years. For every 100 females, there were 93.2 males. For every 100 females age 18 and over, there were 92.3 males.

The median household income was $50,683 and the median family income  was $53,162. Males had a median income of $41,019 versus $28,348 for females. The per capita income for the CDP was $21,087. About 3.0% of families and 5.2% of the population were below the poverty line, including 5.3% of those under age 18 and none of those age 65 or over.

References

Census-designated places in York County, Pennsylvania
Census-designated places in Pennsylvania